Trapt is the major label debut and second studio album by American rock band Trapt. With three hit singles, the album ascended to number 42 on the Billboard 200 chart, and went on to spend more than 80 weeks inside the Billboard 200. It was certified gold by the RIAA on May 15, 2003, then platinum on November 24 of that same year, making it Trapt's most successful album to date.

Critical reception

AllMusic critic Brian O'Neill regarded the album as "as enthusiastic as it is plagiaristic," while noting "the organic feel to the disc that separates it from their more angst-ridden peers." O'Neill further wrote that the record "isn't original, per se, as much as it does a good job melding its pronounced influences more seamlessly than most; the band would get a better recommendation if the record had songs that stood out a bit more." Melodics Pär Winberg stated that Trapt features a "softer and more pop-orientated voice that I think is great for this type of music, compared to all clones out there."

Track listing

 Starting at 4:08 when "New Beginning" ends there's an additional five minutes of ambient music. Constant bass and guitar notes are repeated and after about two minutes light sounds of static and breathing can be heard. Lines of spoken gibberish are then heard for the rest of the song.

Album art
In an interview with VH1, Chris Taylor Brown stated the picture of a man mowing a lawn was selected to show the choices and results an individual can make in life.

Charts

Weekly charts

Year-end charts

Singles

Certifications

Personnel

Trapt
 Chris Taylor Brown – lead vocals, rhythm guitar on "Echo"
 Simon Ormandy – lead guitar
 Pete Charell – bass
 Aaron "Monty" Montgomery – drums

Additional Musicians
 Louis Leggieri – rhythm guitar on "The Game"
 Joe Boyajian – didgeridoo on "New Beginning"
 Frank Palangi – acoustic guitar on "Echo"

References

Albums produced by Garth Richardson
Trapt albums
Warner Records albums
2002 albums